Rexton Rawlston Fernando Gordon (born 17 January 1966), better known by his stage name Shabba Ranks, is a Jamaican dancehall musician. In the late 1980s and early 1990s, he was one of the most popular Jamaican musicians in the world. Throughout his prominence in his home country as a dancehall artist, he gained popularity in North America with his studio album, Just Reality, in 1990. He released two studio albums, As Raw as Ever and X-tra Naked, which both won a Grammy Award as Best Reggae Album in 1992 and 1993, respectively. He is notoriously popular for "Mr. Loverman" and "Ting-A-Ling", which were globally acclaimed and deemed his signature songs.

Early life and family
Shabba Ranks was born in Sturge Town, Saint Ann, Jamaica, and raised in Seaview Gardens, Kingston. He and his wife, Michelle, have two sons Rexton Jr and Jahwon. He currently resides in New York City.

His father, Ivan Gordon, was a mason who died in 1990. His mother, Constance "Mama Christie" Christie, remained in Seaview after Shabba's success, feeding the community with money sent from her son after his emigration. She was the subject of the 2015 hit song Shabba Madda Pot from dancehall artist Dexta Daps.

Career
He gained his fame mainly by toasting (or rapping) rather than singing, like some of his dancehall contemporaries in Jamaica. He was a protégé of DJ Josey Wales. His original stage name was Co-Pilot. His international career started in the late 1980s, along with a number of fellow Jamaicans including reggae singers Cocoa Tea and Crystal. Ranks also worked with Chuck Berry and American rappers KRS-One and Chubb Rock.

He secured a recording contract with Epic Records in 1989.

The stylistic origins of the genre reggaeton can be traced back to the 1990 song "Dem Bow", from Ranks' album Just Reality. Produced by Bobby "Digital" Dixon, the Dem Bow riddim became so popular in Puerto Rican freestyle sessions that early Puerto Rican reggaeton was simply known as "Dembow". The Dem Bow riddim is an integral and inseparable part of reggaeton, so much so that it has become its defining characteristic.

His biggest hit single outside of Jamaica was the reggae fusion smash "Mr. Loverman". Other big tracks include "Housecall" with Maxi Priest, "Slow and Sexy" with Johnny Gill, "Respect", "Pirates Anthem", "Trailer Load a Girls", "Wicked inna Bed", "Caan Dun", and "Ting A Ling". He won the Grammy Award for Best Reggae Album in 1992 for As Raw as Ever and in 1993 for X-tra Naked.

In 1993, Ranks scored another hit in the Addams Family Values soundtrack to which he contributed a rap/reggae version of the Sly and the Family Stone hit "Family Affair". His third album for Epic, A Mi Shabba, was released in 1995. He was dropped by the label in 1996. Epic went on to release a greatest hits album, entitled Shabba Ranks and Friends in 1999.

Ranks made a partial comeback in 2007 when he appeared on a song called "Clear the Air" by Busta Rhymes, which also featured Akon. Shabba released a single on Big Ship's Pepper Riddim called "None A Dem", in April 2011. In 2012, Shabba was featured on Tech N9ne's EP E.B.A.H. on the track "Boy Toy". In 2013, Shabba was also mentioned in A$AP Ferg's song "Shabba," and has a cameo near the end of the music video. He was featured in the remix alongside Migos and Busta Rhymes on 23 November 2013. In August 2013, he was reportedly working on a new album.

Controversy
Ranks has been controversial for homophobia, particularly violent attitudes towards homosexuals. The 1990 song "Wicked in Bed" includes lyrics about shooting gay men.

In 1992, during an appearance on Channel 4 music show The Word, he was asked to give his thoughts on the subject of the hit song, "Boom Bye Bye", by Buju Banton. Shabba held a copy of a Bible which he carried with him and stated that the "word of God" advocated the "crucifixion of homosexuals". He also alluded that he advocates the progression of the Jamaican people and freedom of speech but did not conclude that being against homosexuality would be in question of exclusion, according to bible laws. He was condemned for his comments by presenter Mark Lamarr, who said, "That's absolute crap and you know it." Following these comments, Ranks was dropped from a Bobby Brown concert as a performer and faced altercations with his label, Sony Music. Ranks subsequently apologized, after realizing that his comments might advocate "the killing of gays and lesbians and any human being in retrospect".

Awards

Discography

Studio albums

Compilation albums

Singles

Videos and DVDs
2002 Shabba Ranks: Dancehall Ruff – Best of Shabba Ranks (DVD)
2001 The Return of Shabba Ranks (DVD)
1994 Darker Side of Black
1992 Shabba Ranks: Naked and Ready
1992 Shabba Ranks: Fresh & Wild
1992 Shabba Ranks vs. Ninja Man: Super Clash Round
1990 Reggae Showdown, Vol. 4: Shabba at Showdown (DVD)
1987 Prince Jammy

References

External links
[ Shabba Ranks biography at the AMG website]
Shabba Ranks at Rolling stone.com

1966 births
Living people
People from Saint Ann Parish
Jamaican reggae musicians
Jamaican expatriates in the United States
Jamaican dancehall musicians
Reggae fusion artists
Ragga musicians
Grammy Award winners
Epic Records artists
Greensleeves Records artists